Alex J. Mengel (c. 1955 – 26 April 1985) was a Guyanese-born suspected serial killer and cop killer who was responsible for two killings in 1985 but suspected in many more.

Criminal history and death 
27-year-old Officer Gary Stymiloski of Westchester County Police informed headquarters that he was conducting a routine traffic stop in Yonkers, New York, on the evening of February 24, 1985. Stymiloski radioed for assistance after discovering shotgun ammunition inside the vehicle a short while later. When reinforcements arrived, they discovered him in his cruiser, dead from a single bullet wound to the head. The suspect car was identified as belonging to Guyanan immigrant 30-year-old Alex Mengel who came to the country in November 1976 after it was discovered abandoned in the Bronx. Mengel, a tool and die maker by trade, had only ever been arrested once, in 1984, for physically assaulting his ex-wife. He was also unemployed and facing eviction. At the time of the murder, Mengel's wife Phyrween was living with their child in Richmond, Queens, under the auspices of a domestic violence program in hiding from her husband. Alex fled from the crime scene using Stymiloski's car.

Investigators learned that Mengel was returning from a weekend's shooting in the Catskills, travelling with friends, when Stymiloski flagged him down for speeding. A murder warrant was issued on February 27 after two of his companions who were being kept in custody as material witnesses concurred that the killing was mindless and unjustified. They also told the police that Alex told them that he was going to kill the police officer and, with his instruction, they just had to drive the car back to his home when they heard the gunfire. Three days later, in Toronto, local law enforcement officials saw Mengel outside a shopping mall. In an attempt to flee, the suspect's car hit a wall before veering onto a dead-end street, where he was captured and taken into custody. The stolen vehicle he was driving was registered to 44-year-old Beverly Capone, an IBM computer programmer reported missing by her family, in Mount Vernon, New York, on February 26. She disappeared after leaving work while heading to her white Toyota. Inside the car, two pistols and a woman's scalp were discovered; ballistics testing revealed that one of the weapons had been used to kill Yonkers Police Officer Stymiloski. Items connected to Beverly Capone were discovered by New York state police on March 4 in a summer cabin in the Catskills close to Durham while Mengel sought extradition from Canada.

A half-mile from the cabin, in dense woods, the woman's remains were found eleven days later. Her assailant had hacked off her scalp and facial skin, and she had been stabbed once in the chest. The scalp found in Capone's car in Toronto and tissue samples from the body matched exactly. It was believed Mengel was going to impersonate her as he was wearing her hair, had on lipstick, and had planned on wearing her face. Authorities connected Mengel to the attempted kidnapping of a 13-year-old girl in Skaneateles, New York, southwest of Syracuse, on February 27 using the newly available evidence. The 13-year-old girl told the police that she was delivering papers when a stranger, wearing lipstick and an ill-fitting wig, tried to kidnap her. Escaping without injury, she agreed with detectives that the "wig" might just as well have been a woman's scalp. 

On March 26, Canadian authorities ordered Mengel's deportation to New York as an illegal alien with insufficient money to support himself. A grand jury in Westchester County charged Mengel with first-degree murder in the death of Officer Stymiloski two days later. On April 8, Greene County followed suit and charged Mengel with second-degree murder in the Beverly Capone case. On April 26, Mengel attempted to elude his state police escort on the Taconic State Parkway while returning under guard after his arraignment in Greene County. Mengel attacked state trooper Officer Fred Grunwald who was sitting in the back seat with him while he was handcuffed, grabbing the officer's sidearm, but another state trooper Officer Robert Stabile, who was driving the vehicle, stopped the car and turned around and shot Mengel in the chest. Mengel died immediately. The first state trooper had deep bite wounds on his arm and shoulder but both of the state troopers eventually received commendations for their actions.

Posthumous investigations 
On Thanksgiving Day 1987, New York State Police discovered the corpse of missing 13-year-old Antonella Mattina in a shallow grave in Yorktown, New York. Antonella was killed by multiple stab wounds to her chest area and her death was ruled as a homicide by the coroner's office. Mattina disappeared on July 16, 1984, from Flushing, New York. She was the daughter of a painting contractor and was last seen successfully depositing checks on behalf of her father's business at the local Citibank. The branch located in the Linden Vue Shopping Center at the intersection of Willet and Parson Boulevards’ was just blocks from her home. The five-foot tall, 90-pound, and brown-eyed Antonella was never seen alive again. Antonella’s disappearance triggered one of the most massive searches in New York State history.

On February 25, 1985, Mengel’s mugshot was featured on the front pages of every New York metro area newspaper which reported on Gary’s murder. A local resident contacted the 109 Precinct in Flushing and told investigators he had seen Mengel with Antonella Mattina on the day she vanished, the summer before. Alex Mengel’s older brother, Gustav, an electrician, lived at 31-18 Union Street in Flushing at the time of Antonella’s disappearance, just six blocks from the Linden Vue Shopping Center where Antonella was last seen. Mengel's estranged wife claimed that Alex visited his brother on the day Antonella went missing. Also, Mattina's body was found in an area that Alex was known to go hunting in. Gustav Mengel was convicted in 2001 of two counts of sexual battery upon a 13-year-old girl and spent nine and a half years in a Florida State prison. In 2011, he was arrested again for sexual battery on a 12-year-old girl. It has been postulated that Gustav and Alex both conspired to abduct and murder Antonella. However, her case remains unsolved.

After he was arrested, authorities discovered in Mengel's possession four wallet-size photos and one Polaroid of five unidentified Caucasian young women and a Pennsylvania Tourism map that had a hand drawn circle around the Harrisburg area. Inside that circle were two areas indicated by an “X.” The women have been checked against homicide reports and missing person flyers but no identifications were made and the Pennsylvania State Police were unable to find cold cases in the Harrisburg area that matched exactly in the areas indicated on Mengel’s map.
The marked areas were in the middle of woods and/or fields in areas that were also used for hunting. According to Mengel’s associates he used to frequent that area for hunting and for attending car auctions in 1982.

References 

1950 births
1985 deaths
20th-century American criminals
American male criminals
American people of Guyanese descent
Guyanese emigrants to the United States
People extradited from Canada to the United States
People killed by law enforcement officers in the United States
Suspected serial killers